The Beijing–Guangzhou–Shenzhen–Hong Kong high-speed railway or Jingguangshengang high-speed railway from its Chinese name is a high-speed railway corridor of the CRH passenger service, connecting Beijingxi station in Beijing and Futian station in Shenzhen, Guangdong (from there onwards to cross the border to West Kowloon station in Kowloon, Hong Kong through the XRL) in less than nine hours of travel time. The existing, conventional Jingguang railway runs largely parallel to the line.

The line forms part of the Beijing–Harbin, Beijing–Hong Kong (Macau) corridor, based on the "Eight Verticals and Eight Horizontals" railway master plan announced in 2016.

History
Construction started in 2005. The Wuhan–Guangzhou section opened in December 2009, the Guangzhou–Shenzhen section opened in December 2011, the Zhengzhou–Wuhan section opened in September 2012, and the Beijing–Zhengzhou section was opened in December 2012. The  cross-border Shenzhen–Hong Kong section opened on 23 September 2018. The line is the world's longest high-speed rail route. The high speed rail line cuts travel time by more than half. The line fully opened on 23 September 2018.

Through-services with other high-speed lines
Besides trains running between Beijing, Shijiazhuang, Zhengzhou, Wuhan, Changsha, Guangzhou and Shenzhen, the railway also has direct service with other connecting high-speed lines. The direct Xi'an–Zhengzhou–Wuhan–Guangzhou–Shenzhen service started simultaneously with the opening of the Zhengzhou–Wuhan section in September 2012, as well as the direct interline service Xi'an-Zhengzhou–Beijing, Taiyuan–Shijiazhuang–Guangzhou, Taiyuan–Shijiazhuang–Wuhan–Guangzhou. The Hangzhou–Fuzhou–Shenzhen high-speed railway have through operation to Guangzhou South albeit limited due to track situation in Shenzhen North Station.

Connections to local transport
To minimize disruptions to existing urban areas and provide large curve radii, the Beijing–Guangzhou high-speed railway, similar to other such railways in China, was constructed in an alignment somewhat different from the existing Beijing–Guangzhou Railway. In most cities served by the high-speed railway, its trains stop at stations built specifically for the new line, which are away from the urban core and the city's conventional railway station. In some of the larger cities, it may take more than an hour to ride a bus or taxi from the city centre to the high-speed rail station. One notable exception is Shijiazhuang station, which is shared with conventional trains and located in city centre (but moved south from the original). It is also possible for high-speed trains to stop at Zhengzhou station and Hankou station, which shared the characteristics of Shijiazhuang Station, but unlike Shijiazhuang they are not on main track of the Beijing-Guangzhou High Speed line.

To alleviate this most of the cities involved have improved the public transit access to the new high-speed rail stations, or plan to do so. Guangzhounan station is already served by Guangzhou Metro (Line 2) and Beijingxi station served by Beijing Metro (Line 7, 9). Wuhan station is served by Wuhan Metro's Line 4 and Zhengzhoudong station by Zhengzhou Metro's Line 1, both of which opened in December 2013, and Shijiazhuang station by Shijiazhuang Metro's Line 3, opened in June 2017.

Transfers to other rail lines
Guangzhounan station and Wuhan station are designed as hubs for several high-speed railway (HSR) lines. Frequent service to Zhuhai is available at Guangzhou South, while a connection to Yichang can be made at Wuhan.

Although the Beijing–Guangzhou HSR largely parallels the older conventional Beijing–Guangzhou line, most of the HSR stations are located away from the local conventional train stations. Therefore, direct transfer to conventional (not high-speed) trains is possible only at a few stations along the route. Among them are Beijing West (which is one of the nation's main passenger railway hubs), Shijiazhuang, and Guangzhoubei.

Immigration clearance
As Hong Kong is a Special Administrative Region, the Shenzhen-Hong Kong portion of the high speed rail passes through an immigration control point. The West Kowloon Terminus was designed to allow both Mainland and Hong Kong officials to conduct immigration control in Hong Kong, but for several years there was an unclear constitutional issue as Mainland officials were thought not to have the constitutional authority to enforce Mainland law in Hong Kong. In November 2017, the Government of Hong Kong resolved this by signing the Co-operation Arrangement for Implementing Co-location Arrangement, designating a portion of West Kowloon railway station as the "Mainland Port Area" that would be subject to Mainland law. Travelers coming from Hong Kong therefore pass through Mainland immigration and customs clearance before boarding their trains, allowing direct service to the entire Mainland high-speed rail network without having to stop at the Mainland-Hong Kong border.

Sections
Operational lines in the table below are marked with green background.

Station list 

Major railway terminals are in bold. Medium-size stations that trains can regularly terminate are in Italics

See also
Beijing–Hong Kong high-speed railway

References

External links

Ticketing Information

High-speed railway lines in China
Standard gauge railways in China
Standard gauge railways in Hong Kong